Callum Daniel (born 28 August 2008) is a British entrepreneur, presenter and founder of iCodeRobots, a technology company based in Loughborough University London focussed on giving children of all backgrounds and income levels access to classes training them to build and code robots and engaging them in a wide range of current and future tech.

At 7 years old he became one of the youngest CEOs in the UK.

Early life 
Daniel was born in London, England, the son of a British mother Dionne Daniel and British father Paul Daniel John-Charles. Daniel is an only child raised in London. Daniel is the great-grandson of Malcolm Daniel who served as a Senator in Antigua's Parliament, the first President of Antigua and Barbuda's workers union and also 2nd Vice President of the Caribbean Congress of Labour.

Career 
By partnering with other tech firms, Daniel managed to develop and execute a campaign that led to free sessions for 1000 children. In 2020 Daniel became part of a team who fund raised and created over 6500 PPE Visors for the healthcare industry during lockdown.

Listed as a Change Maker at the 2020 Children Media Conference (CMC) Daniel spoke on how to inspire future generations  - Can tech and media collaborate to power learning for the younger generations? What impact could the media have in developing a high skilled, diverse workforce that can compete for the jobs of the future? Are the kids even watching?

In 2017 Daniel first spoke at Kidzania's inaugural Kidpreneur festival to inspire business leaders of the future and introduce children to the world of robotics by conducting robotic workshops. Financial Times journalist Jonathan Moules reviewed Daniel's workshop after attending with his sons which lead to more interest in Daniel's mission. Daniel continued to feature in the media on his mission to inspire children into technology including a part in BBC documentary Kidpreneurs, BBC Radio one stories  and various media 

In 2018 Daniel's career extended to becoming a host and presenter including a feature on LEGO's Discover channel with a series encouraging children to code and build robots, Tech conferences  award shows and red carpet film premieres where he interviews talent such as Will Smith, Pharrell, Guy Ritchie, Alan Menken to name a few.

Daniel became an ambassador for Guild Esports Academy early 2021. The company is co-owned by former professional football player David Beckham and launched globally in June 2020.

Awards 
 Young STEM Personality of the Year 2021, global award by The Institute of Engineering and Technology
 Diana Award 2020 winner. Established in memory of Diana, Princess of Wales by The Diana Award
 Young Entrepreneur Award 2018 - by Newham Youth Achievement Award
 Educational Innovation Award 2018 - by RoundTable Global
 Inspire Awards 2017- The Soul Project
 Best media coverage of the year award - Ultra Education

References 

People from London
2008 births
Living people